Yury Alekseyevich Yevdokimov (born 10 December 1945) was the Governor of Murmansk Oblast, Russia.  He became the governor in 1996 and was reelected with a large overall majority on March 14, 2004. He was dismissed in March 2009 by presidential decree (at his own request, according to the Kremlin) after he had been criticized by President Dmitry Medvedev of "fooling around abroad" and "betraying Arctic interests".

Honours and awards
Order of Merit for the Fatherland;
3rd class (1 January 2006) - for outstanding contribution to the socio-economic development of the field and many years of honest work
4th class (8 December 1999) - for his great personal contribution to the socio-economic development of the field
Order of the Badge of Honour
Commander of the Royal Norwegian Order of Merit (29 August 2007)

References

1946 births
Living people
Governors of Murmansk Oblast
Recipients of the Order "For Merit to the Fatherland", 3rd class